Centru may refer to:

Sectorul Centru, Chișinău, Moldova
Centru (development region), Romania
Centru, Cluj-Napoca, Romania